Eacles canaima is a moth in the family Saturniidae. It is found in Venezuela. It is light yellow with some slight orange.

References

Ceratocampinae
Moths described in 1971